Saša Jelovac (born 14 January 1981) is a Serbian professional football forward.

Club career
Jelovac previously played for FK Zemun in the First League of FR Yugoslavia Then he moved to Macedonia where he played in the First League sides FK Sileks in 2002–03, and FK Belasica in 2003–04 and FK Shkendija in 2004–05.

Jelovac moved to Greece in 2005, and has played for several second and third division clubs, including Paniliakos F.C., Trikala F.C., Olympiakos Volos F.C., Panetolikos F.C. and Makedonikos F.C. He was released by Makedonikos in 2009, and joined third division rivals Fokikos F.C. in February 2010.

In 2012, he played with Brantford Galaxy in the Canadian Soccer League, and returned for the 2018 season.

References

External links
Profile at EPAE.org

1981 births
Living people
Serbian footballers
FK Zemun players
FK Sileks players
FK Belasica players
KF Shkëndija players
Expatriate footballers in North Macedonia
Panetolikos F.C. players
Paniliakos F.C. players
Trikala F.C. players
Olympiacos Volos F.C. players
Pyrsos Grevena F.C. players
Expatriate footballers in Greece
Makedonikos F.C. players
Fokikos A.C. players
Brantford Galaxy players
Canadian Soccer League (1998–present) players
Association football forwards
Macedonian First Football League players
Football League (Greece) players